Brookula stibarochila is a species of sea snail, a marine gastropod mollusk, unassigned in the superfamily Seguenzioidea.

Description
The height of the shell attains 1.4 mm.

Distribution
This marine species occurs off New Zealand.

References

External links
 To Biodiversity Heritage Library (6 publications)
 To World Register of Marine Species

stibarochila
Gastropods described in 1912